John Marcus Berg, F.S.S.P. (born 1970) is an American Catholic priest and former Superior General of the Priestly Fraternity of Saint Peter. He was elected on July 7, 2006 by the General Chapter of the Fraternity at its mother house in Wigratzbad, Germany, for a six-year term. Fr. Berg was elected to a second term as Superior General at the FSSP's fifth General Chapter in July 2012. Berg's second term as Superior General concluded on July 9, 2018.

Biography
Father Berg was born to a Catholic family in Minnesota in 1970. Fr. Berg graduated from the Academy of Holy Angels in Richfield, MN. Berg studied philosophy at Thomas Aquinas College in California from 1989 to 1993, where he discerned a vocation to the priesthood. In 1994, he entered the Fraternity's seminary in Wigratzbad, where he studied for two years; he finished his studies with a Licentiate in Dogmatic Theology from the Pontifical University of the Holy Cross in Rome. Ordained by Bishop James Timlin of Scranton on September 6, 1997, he has worked as both a pastor and as a seminary professor. Until his election to Superior General, Berg was chaplain of the Latin Mass Community of Sacramento, California.

After stepping down as Superior of the FSSP, Berg was appointed as pastor of St. Mary's Church on Broadway in Providence, Rhode Island.   In August 2021 he was transferred to the Immaculate Conception Church in Omaha, Nebraska.

References

External links
Priestly Fraternity of St. Peter - international website with pages in English, French, German, Spanish, Portuguese, Italian, Polish, and Latin
Organizational chart of F.S.S.P. leadership
An interview with Fr. Berg from The Remnant, 2007

1970 births
Living people
Priestly Fraternity of St. Peter
Thomas Aquinas College alumni
Pontifical University of the Holy Cross alumni
20th-century American Roman Catholic priests
Traditionalist Catholic priests
American traditionalist Catholics
21st-century American Roman Catholic priests